Doctor Who: Destiny of the Doctors is an action video game based on the BBC British science fiction television series Doctor Who. It was released on 5 December 1997 by BBC Multimedia.

Overview 
A collaboration between BBC Multimedia and the British developer Studio Fish, Destiny of the Doctors is a CD-ROM which received an 11+ age rating from ELSPA. It is supported by Microsoft Windows 95 and works on all subsequent forms of Windows, though some PCs running XP and Vista experience compatibility issues. It was released in the United Kingdom, Ireland and Australia, as well as some countries in Europe, and found modest acclaim from some magazines, including the now defunct PC Planet.

The game featured extensive, newly recorded audio dialogue by Tom Baker, Peter Davison, Colin Baker, Sylvester McCoy and Nicholas Courtney. William Hartnell and Patrick Troughton were represented by a voice actor impersonating their portrayals of the First and Second Doctors. The substitute Hartnell and Troughton clips were laced with artificial grain to simulate vintage recordings. Jon Pertwee originally agreed to appear in the game but died before recording could take place; by agreement with his widow, Ingeborg Pertwee, he was represented in the game using audio clips from the television series. The game also contains Anthony Ainley's final recorded performance as the Master before his death. It also marks the first, and only, time that Ainley played the Master with a natural, grown beard rather than a false one.

The story was written by longtime Doctor Who writer Terrance Dicks.

Cast
The Third Doctor - Jon Pertwee (archive audio)
The Fourth Doctor - Tom Baker
The Fifth Doctor - Peter Davison
The Sixth Doctor - Colin Baker
The Seventh Doctor - Sylvester McCoy
The Master - Anthony Ainley
Brigadier Lethbridge-Stewart - Nicholas Courtney

Note: David Coker voiced the First Doctor and Second Doctor.

Plot

The Doctor's nemesis the Master has taken control of the planet Siralos, which is made of "pure psychic energy". With this planet's power, he plans to mould the universe into his will. To begin, he takes the first seven incarnations of the Doctor out of time and space and puts them in the Determinant, a domain he has created from the conquered will of Siralos. He plans to eradicate any trace of the Doctor from time and space, so he may be free to rebuild the cosmos as he pleases. However, the player's character, the Graak (a psychic being created by the Doctor), pledges to stop the Master's plans, and the game begins.

The Graak is an intelligent, psychic and seemingly altruistic organism, turquoise in colour and resembling a jellyfish. It floats about four feet from the ground, and has no visible organs nor any recognizable features. The Master states that the Graak is protoplasmic. Although it has no limbs, the Graak is dexterous enough to be able to handle items such as a sonic screwdriver and a radio transmitter. It only speaks when it asks the Doctor questions as part of a challenge, and has a high voice varying in tone and inflection (implying that speaking is a strain). When the Master calls the Graak "a good little doggie", it is heard to bark.

It is a matter of debate as to how the game fits into the continuity of Doctor Who. There are references to the "seven complete incarnations of the Doctor", with no reference made to either the Eighth Doctor, despite the game being released some time after the 1996 TV movie. However, the TARDIS database does vaguely mention the Seventh Doctor's regeneration. It has been speculated that the Master's imprisonment at the end of the game is by the Daleks, which would then lead into the opening of the TV Movie. This could also explain the absence of any mention of the Eighth Doctor (if the events of the game are set before the TV Movie).

Gameplay 
The bulk of the game takes place in the Doctor's TARDIS (and, on occasion, the Master's TARDIS, reached via "junctions" between the two time machines). The game begins in the Console Room of the Fourth Doctor's TARDIS, and the player must then select one of the Doctor's seven incarnations and activate the TARDIS to go in search of them.

Upon reaching the TARDIS of the selected Doctor (and also before almost every puzzle in the game), the player can use a "Time Winder" (a pyramid-like save point) and then set out into the TARDIS to find the Master (and, accordingly, the Doctor).

Upon leaving the Console Room, the player, as the Graak, must find the Great Divide: a chasm which separates the TARDIS from the Determinant. However, the Master has placed several of the Doctor's enemies in the TARDIS to make things more difficult for the Graak, such as Daleks, Cybermen, Autons, Ice Warriors, Quarks, Sea Devils, Silurians, Sontarans, Yeti and Zygons. There are weapons and implements in the TARDIS that can be used to incapacitate or kill these monsters, some of which can be kept throughout the quest (such as the sonic screwdriver, or a radio used to contact Brigadier Lethbridge-Stewart for advice and hints), and others which can only be used for a limited time (such as Dalekanium and watering cans).

Upon reaching the Great Divide, the player selects a symbol and the Master gives the Graak a riddle. During the loading time, a map of the area of the TARDIS the player will explore is shown. The Graak will have to complete a certain objective (e.g. perform the Doctor Who theme on floor tiles), find certain information on monsters or Doctors (either from the Doctor's "City of Thoughts" database in his TARDIS or from the Master's "Monster Database"), or collect an item (such as a Stattenheim remote, or a Nestene Consciousness control sphere). Whilst the player is scouring the TARDIS(es), they may use telepathic links with the Doctor (resembling the TV title sequence effect of the Third Doctor's episodes) and the Doctor will give a short clue to the player. Having completed their task (out of a possible 28 tasks), the Graak then returns and gives the Master the item, or crosses a grid of tiles, or selects the true Doctor out of three possible choices, or similar. If the player fails, they will have to begin again (from the nearest Time Winder). If they succeed, they will have to face the Master in the Determinant. If they defeat the Master, that incarnation of the Doctor is freed:

First Doctor - A chase around the Celestial Toymaker's toybox (with Quarks)
Second Doctor - A race against the Master on London Underground trains (with Yeti)
Third Doctor - Seek and destroy the Dalek spaceship
Fourth Doctor - Search around the maze that is the Doctor's mind (with Raston Warrior Robots)
Fifth Doctor - A joust in a medieval ring against a Sontaran on a hoverbike
Sixth Doctor - Search the icy wilderness of Mars to find the Doctor
Seventh Doctor - Race against the Master's car in the Doctor's Edwardian car, Bessie (with Autons)

Reception
The game received mixed reviews.
PC Gamer saw the game as part of a larger trend of disappointing Doctor Who games despite the rich subject matter. In analysing the challenges Doctor Who poses to video gaming, the site noted that the personality of the Doctor himself would necessitate abstract item puzzles or dialogue-based puzzles rather than action-oriented gameplay.

In a retrospective article for Destructoid, Anthony Burch said the game was "one of the most unplayable, unenjoyable games ever created".

Despite the mixed reviews, Anthony Ainley's performance as The Master was widely praised by audiences.

Other releases 

All of Anthony Ainley's recorded scenes as the Master from this game were included on the DVD release of Survival but without the background music played in them.

References

External links

 
 
 

1997 video games
BBC Multimedia games
Cybermen stories
Doctor Who multi-Doctor stories
Doctor Who multi-Master stories
Fifth Doctor stories
First Doctor stories
Fourth Doctor stories
Destiny
Second Doctor stories
Seventh Doctor stories
Single-player video games
Sixth Doctor stories
Third Doctor stories
Destiny of the Doctors
Video games developed in the United Kingdom
Windows games
Windows-only games